South Carolina Highway 358 (SC 358) is a  state highway in the western part of the U.S. state of South Carolina. It travels from Lyman through more rural and suburban parts of Spartanburg County.

Route description
The highway starts at SC 357 northwest of Lyman. It heads along the two-lane Holly Springs Road towards central Lyman passing numerous houses, some churches, and a pair of schools. As it approaches its terminus within the town limits of Lyman, it enters a small commercial district.

Major intersections

See also

References

External links

SC 358 at Virginia Highways' South Carolina Highways Annex

357
Transportation in Spartanburg County, South Carolina